Chlosyne definita, known generally as the definite patch or definite checkerspot, is a species of checkerspot in the family Nymphalidae. It is found in North America.

The MONA or Hodges number for Chlosyne definita is 4500.

Subspecies
 Chlosyne definita anastasia (Hemming, 1934)
 Chlosyne definita definita (E. Aaron, 1885)

References

 Pelham, Jonathan P. (2008). "A catalogue of the butterflies of the United States and Canada with a complete bibliography of the descriptive and systematic literature". Journal of Research on the Lepidoptera, vol. 40, xiv + 658.

Further reading

 Arnett, Ross H. (2000). American Insects: A Handbook of the Insects of America North of Mexico. CRC Press.

definita